The 2016 United States presidential election in Louisiana was held on Tuesday, November 8, 2016, as part of the 2016 United States presidential election in which all 50 states plus the District of Columbia participated. Louisiana voters chose electors to represent them in the Electoral College via a popular vote, pitting the Republican Party's nominee, businessman Donald Trump, and running mate Indiana Governor Mike Pence against Democratic Party nominee, former Secretary of State Hillary Clinton, and her running mate Virginia Senator Tim Kaine. Louisiana has eight electoral votes in the Electoral College.

Trump won the state with 58.09% of the vote, while Clinton received 38.45%. Trump performed slightly better in the state than Mitt Romney in 2012, but also slightly worse than John McCain in 2008. In contrast, Clinton's vote share in the state was a decrease from Barack Obama's vote shares in 2012 and 2008, where he earned 40.58% and 39.93%, respectively. This makes it the largest loss by a Democrat since Democratic nominee Walter Mondale in 1984.  Louisiana is also one of 11 states whose electoral votes went to Bill Clinton twice, but which Hillary Clinton did not win. Six of those states, including Louisiana, have not supported any Democratic Presidential candidate since Bill Clinton (The other five being Arkansas, West Virginia, Kentucky, Tennessee, and Missouri), while an additional five (Iowa, Ohio, Wisconsin, Michigan, and Pennsylvania) had all voted Democratic at least twice since Bill Clinton's re-election in 1996.

Primary elections
Twenty-four candidates were on the ballot.

Democratic primary

Republican primary

Four candidates appeared on the Republican presidential primary ballot:

State Convention
On March 24, the State Convention met in an attempt to reverse the results of the primary, giving Ted Cruz a clear majority.
After conflicting reporting of their support for Ted Cruz, four of Rubio's five delegates publicly rebuked the reporting and committed to staying undecided. Rubio's five delegates and 2 uncommitted delegates committed to Trump after Kasich and Cruz dropped out of the race.  This gave Trump the majority of the delegates from the state.

General Election

Polling

Predictions
The following are final 2016 predictions from various organizations for Louisiana as of Election Day.

Results

Donald Trump carried the state, lengthening the Republican streak in Louisiana to 5 straight contests.

By parish

By congressional district
Trump won 5 of the 6 congressional districts in Louisiana.

Analysis
Donald Trump won the election in Louisiana with 58.1% of the vote. Hillary Clinton received 38.4% of the vote. Of the 2,029,032 total votes cast, Trump had 1,178,638 while Clinton had 780,154 votes. All of Louisiana's parishes voted for the same party they voted for in 2012 and 2008. As a result, this marked the first time since 1992 that East Baton Rouge Parish backed the losing candidate of the election, and the first time since 1948 that East Baton Rouge Parish voted  for the Democratic candidate three elections in a row; Trump also became the first Republican to win the White House without carrying this parish since Richard Nixon in 1968.

Louisiana was one of eleven states that voted twice for Bill Clinton in 1992 and 1996 which Hillary Clinton lost in 2016.

See also
 United States presidential elections in Louisiana
 Presidency of Donald Trump
 2016 Democratic Party presidential debates and forums
 2016 Democratic Party presidential primaries
 2016 Republican Party presidential debates and forums
 2016 Republican Party presidential primaries

References

External links
 RNC 2016 Republican Nominating Process 
 Green papers for 2016 primaries, caucuses, and conventions
 Decision Desk Headquarter Results for Louisiana

Louisiana
2016
Presidential